Kevin Reynolds (born July 23, 1990) is a retired Canadian figure skater. He is the 2013 Four Continents champion, 2010 Four Continents bronze medallist, 2014 Winter Olympics team silver medallist and a six-time Canadian national medallist (2012–14, 2017 silver;  2010, 2016 bronze). His highest place at a World Championship is fifth, achieved at 2013 World Championships.
On the junior level, he is the 2006 JGP Final bronze medallist.

Reynolds is the first skater to have landed two quadruple jumps in a short program. He is the first to have landed five quadruple jumps in one competition — at the 2013 Four Continents, he landed two quads in the short program and three in the free skate.

Personal life
Reynolds was born July 23, 1990, in North Vancouver, British Columbia to Daniel and Cindy Reynolds. His mother, Cindy Reynolds, is a cytotechnologist. He has a younger brother. Reynolds raised in Coquitlam. Kevin has Scottish, Ukrainian and a bit of Irish heritage. In addition to figure skating, Kevin trained hockey in his young years.

Reynolds was home schooled to accommodate his training schedule. He graduated from the University of British Columbia, in international relations, with a minor in Japanese Language and Culture in May 2019. He speaks three languages: English, Japanese and French. In December 2016 he passed the N2 level of Japanese-Language Proficiency Test, the second-hardest difficulty level and is organized by the Japan Foundation and Japan Educational Exchanges and Services. His interest in Japanese culture developed in his youth and amassed him a large Japanese following during his skating career. In 2016, he used the song "Tank!" from the anime Cowboy Bebop in a routine while dressed as the anime's protagonist Spike Spiegel. When asked in an interview at World Team Trophy, he stated that his favourite Pokémon is Farfetch'd.

At the 2023 Canadian National Championships Reynolds revealed that he was working on his Master's degree in Public Administration. He also revealed that he was serving on the board of directors for the Green Party of  Vancouver

Career

Early years 

Reynolds began skating at age five and began training with coach Joanne McLeod when he was nine. He won the Canadian Nationals at the Juvenile level in 2001 and the novice level in 2003 at age 12. The next year, he was fourth at the junior level, giving him a spot on the junior national team. This earned him a spot to the Junior Grand Prix (JGP), where he placed 5th at his first event. At Nationals, he moved up to second place at the junior level.

2005–06 season 
Reynolds placed 9th in his senior national debut, at the 2006 Canadian Championships. At the 2006 World Junior Championships, he finished 7th after landing a 4S in the free skate.

2006–07 season 
In the 2006–07 season, Reynolds won a JGP event in Mexico and placed second in Taiwan. At the JGP Final, despite suffering from food poisoning, he won the bronze medal after landing his first 4T in competition.

2007–08 season 
At the 2008 Canadian Championships, Reynolds landed a quad-triple-triple combination in his free program, the first Canadian to accomplish this. He is the second skater of three in the world, under the ISU Judging System, to land the combination in international competition, after Evgeni Plushenko and before Kevin van der Perren.

2008–09 season 
In 2008–09, Reynolds finished fourth in both Grand Prix appearances and at the national championships. He was assigned at the last moment to compete at the Junior World Championships, where he came in 9th.

2009–10 season 

Although Reynolds was not selected for the Canadian Olympic team, Skate Canada assigned him to the 2010 Four Continents Championships and the World Championships. At Four Continents, Reynolds led after the short program, and although he faltered in the free skate, the combined score was enough to earn him the bronze medal. At his first World Championships, Reynolds popped a jump in the short program, but earned the second highest technical score in the free skate portion of the event, finishing in 11th place overall.

2010–11 season 
At the 2010 Skate Canada International, Reynolds became the first skater to ever land two quadruple jumps in a short program. Taking advantage of an off-season rule change allowing skaters to do both a solo quadruple jump and one in combination, Reynolds opened his program with a 4S-3T combo and later landed a solo 4T. The two elements netted him 26.32 points of his 80.09 total.

Reynolds was fourth at the Canadian Championships and was named to the Canadian team for Four Continents and as an alternate for the World Championships. He finished 11th at the 2011 Four Continents in February. In the short program he aggravated a hip injury from December and took time off following the competition, but began training again when he was added to the Canadian team for the 2011 World Championships, replacing Shawn Sawyer who had dropped out. He finished 20th at the event.

2011–12 season 

In 2011–12, Reynolds was selected to compete at two Grand Prix events. He was seventh in his first event, the 2011 Cup of China, and withdrew from his second event, the 2011 Trophée Éric Bompard. He took the silver medal at the 2012 Canadian Championships and was selected to represent Canada at the 2012 Four Continents and 2012 Worlds. He finished eighth at Four Continents and 12th at Worlds.

2012–13 season 
During the 2012–13 season, Reynolds finished fifth and sixth, respectively, at his two Grand Prix events, the 2012 Cup of China and the 2012 NHK Trophy. He took the silver medal at the Canadian Championships for the second time. Reynolds was selected to represent Canada at the 2013 Four Continents and 2013 Worlds. He won gold at the Four Continents Championships. Following the event, a cyst ruptured in the back of his left knee. He finished 5th at the World Championships in London, Ontario, Canada.

2013–14 season 
In the 2013–14 season, Reynolds withdrew from his two Grand Prix events due to skate boot problems. He took the silver medal at the 2014 Canadian Championships and was selected to represent Canada at the 2014 Winter Olympics in Sochi. At the Olympics, he helped Team Canada win the silver medal in the team event and finished 15th in the men's singles event. He finished the season with an 11th-place finish at the 2014 World Championships.

2014–15 season 
In the 2014–15 season, Reynolds again withdrew from his two Grand Prix assignments due to injury and skate boot issues. He withdrew from the 2015 Canadian Championships after finishing 12th in the short program.

2016–17 season 
Kevin returned to prominence in the 2016–17 season. It began with a silver medal at the Nepela Memorial and then he won bronze at the Skate Canada International: his first-ever Skate Canada medal. He met disappointment with a 12th-place finish at the Four Continents. Despite falling in the Short Program, he finished 2nd at the 2017 Canadian Championships allowing him to compete at the World Championships for the first time in three years where he finished 9th with a personal best in the free skate.

2017–18 season 

In 2017–18, Reynolds was selected to compete at two Grand Prix events. He met disappointment with an 11th-place finish at the Finlandia Trophy. Reynolds was eighth in the 2017 Cup of China (moved up from 10th after the short program to eighth overall).

2018–19 season 
On December 19, 2018, Reynolds announced his retirement from competitive skating. In a statement, Reynolds said, “Despite an encouraging start to the season with a new personal best short program, I was unable maintain this form and my body has started to tell me it has had enough. It was a tough decision but given the circumstances I know it is the right choice.”

Elements 
His favorite quad is the salchow, which he first landed at 15, and he has also practiced a quad loop.

Equipment and service

Kevin Reynolds uses Risport boots (since 2011) and MK blades. Since 2006 he is serviced by Cyclone Taylor Figure Skating Technical Specialists.

Records and achievements

 Reynolds was the youngest male skater (17 years old) and first Canadian skater to land a quad-triple-triple combination (quad toe-triple toe-triple loop — 4T+3T+3Lo) at the 2008 Canadian Figure Skating Championships. He was the second to do so (after Evgeni Plushenko).
 He was the first skater to successfully land two quadruple jumps (quad salchow-triple toe loop — 4S+3T and quad toe-loop — 4T) in a short program at the 2010 Skate Canada International.
 He was the first skater to attempt a quad loop (4Lo) at 2011 Cup of China (unfortunately the jump was downgraded, then he fell) and 2012 World Team Trophy (the jump was underrotated, then he fell).
 He was the first skater to successfully land five quads in one competition (at the 2013 Four Continents; two quads in the short program — 4S+3T, 4T and three in the free skate — 4S, 4T+3T and 4T).
 He was the first Canadian skater to land six quads in one competition (in the 2017 World Championships; in the short program — 4S+3T and 4T; in the free skate — 4S+2T, 4T+3T, 4S and 4T).
 He was the first skater to attempt a quad salchow-triple toe loop-triple loop (4S+3T+3Lo) combination in his free skater at 2018 Four Continents Championships. Unfortunately a quad salchow was underrotated.

Programs

Competitive highlights

GP: Grand Prix; CS: Challenger Series; JGP: Junior Grand Prix

2009–10 to present

2002–03 to 2008–09

Detailed results 
Small medals for short and free programs are awarded only at ISU Championships. ISU personal bests are highlighted in bold.

2009–10 to present 

  – This is a team event; medals are awarded for the team results only.
  – team result
  – personal/individual result

2002–03 to 2008–09 

  – Total factored placements

References

External links

 
 
 Skate Canada profile
 Official Instagram
 Kevin Reynolds Rink Results

1990 births
Living people
People from Coquitlam
Canadian male single skaters
Four Continents Figure Skating Championships medalists
Figure skaters at the 2014 Winter Olympics
Olympic figure skaters of Canada
Medalists at the 2014 Winter Olympics
Olympic medalists in figure skating
Olympic silver medalists for Canada
Sportspeople from North Vancouver